Kurt Bøgh (c. 1933-2011) was an international speedway rider from Denmark.

Speedway career 
Kurt Bøgh won four silver medals and three bronze medals during the Danish Individual Speedway Championship in 1966, 1967, 1968, 1970, 1971, 1973 and 1974.

He won a silver medal during the Speedway World Pairs Championship in the 1973 Speedway World Pairs Championship.

World Final appearances

World Pairs Championship
 1973 -  Borås (with Ole Olsen) - 2nd - 21pts

Family
His brother Ernst Bøgh was also a speedway rider.

References 

1930s births
2011 deaths
Year of birth uncertain
Danish speedway riders